Class  is an Indian Hindi-language crime drama thriller streaming television series adapted by Ashim Ahluwalia from the Spanish series Elite. It is set in Hampton International, a fictional elite high school in Delhi, and revolves around the relationships between three working-class students enrolled at the school and their wealthy classmates. The series was produced by Bodhi Tree Multimedia and Future East Film.

The series explores a wide range of social issues affecting modern youth, including casteism, child neglect, corruption, homophobia, religious discrimination, and income inequality in India. Class consisting of 8 episodes was released on 3 February 2023 on Netflix. On 6 March 2023, Netflix confirmed the series has been renewed for its second season.

Premise 
After their local school is destroyed in a fire, three working-class friends – Dheeraj, Saba, and Balli – are offered scholarships to Hampton International, an elite private school in New Delhi. The scholarships are sponsored by the Ahuja Properties, who were at fault for the fire. At Hampton International, the three are initially ostracised by wealthy students. But as the school year progresses, their lives intertwine in a clash of lifestyles, resentments, envy, and sexual attraction.

Cast

Main 
 Anjali Sivaraman as Suhani Ahuja, Veer's sister and love interest of Neeraj and Dheeraj. She comes from a wealthy family and has a streak of falling for the 'bad boy'. She rebels against the corrupted ways of her family while maintaining a youthful and joyful spirit.
 Gurfateh Pirzada as Neeraj Kumar Valmiki, Dheeraj's older brother who just got out of prison, who is also a love interest of Suhani. He is vocal against prevalent casteism. His handsome and dangerous aura draws Suhani in. He struggles to pay a debt from prison and will do anything to get his hands on money. He is caring and sensitive to the people close to him. He often finds himself in trouble.
 Piyush Khati as Dheeraj Kumar Valmiki, one of three transfer students who falls for Suhani. A hardworking, shy, and tricky guy.
 Madhyama Segal as Saba Manzoor, one of three transfer students, a daughter of Kashmiri immigrants, who is Veer's love interest. She is academically driven and holds her religious and personal values close to her. She eventually faces discrimination and Islamophobia at school and is banned from wearing the hijab at school.
 Cwaayal Singh as Balram Patwal (more commonly called Balli), one of the three transfer students. He is immediately attracted to Koel. A comical and carefree transfer student who tries to assimilate with the richer students.
 Zeyn Shaw as Veer Ahuja, brother of Suhani, and Yashika's boyfriend, who falls for Saba. A hot-headed popular guy at school. He believes his way is always the right way. He is extremely protective of his sister and does not bond well with the transfer students. He would do anything for his friends.
 Chintan Rachchh as Faruq Manzoor, Saba's brother and a drug dealer who falls for Dhruv. He is a closeted gay guy who struggles with pleasing his parents while living his true self. He dealt drugs to make enough money to move out. He is confident and detail-oriented.
 Naina Bhan as Koel Kalra, Sharan's longtime girlfriend, and Balli's sex partner. She is beautiful, cold, manipulative, and extremely wealthy. She uses her sexuality to get what she wants. A softer side of her is shown as she cares about the people she loves and will go to extreme lengths to cover up their faults and supports them.
 Ayesha Kanga as Yashika Mehta, Veer's girlfriend who strives to be at the top. She will go to extreme lengths to secure what she believes will bring her happiness even by manipulating people; however, she is aware that she will never be satisfied no matter how much she has. She has a strong dislike for Saba.
 Moses Koul as Sharan Gujral, Koel's longtime boyfriend. He is submissive in nature and will follow the orders of the people he is close to. He is bisexual and extremely wealthy.
 Chayan Chopra as Dhruv Sanghvi, son of the principal and swimming coach who falls for Faruq. He is constantly pressured by his parents to excel in everything he does. This pushes him to take drugs. He is driven to get what he wants while caring deeply for the people that matter most to him. He is gay and explores his sexuality with Faruq.

Recurring 
 Chandan Anand as Suraj Ahuja
 Ritu Shivpuri as Garima Ahuja
 Kabir Sadanand as Tarun Kalra
 Suparana Krishna Moitra as Yamini Kalra
 Ratnabali Bhattacharjee as Vandana Sanghvi
 Ketan Singh as Deven Sanghvi
 Shahid Lateef as Yusuf Manzoor
 Neelofar Sheikh as Afroz Manzoor
 Vijay Srivastava as Bhagu Kumar Valmiki
 Reuben Israel as Ranjit Gujral
 Richista Gulati as Sulekha Gujral
 Aviral Gupta as Aryan Talwar 
 Arshvir Wahi as Mikhail Bakshi
 Darshan Pandya as Inspector Bindya
 Vijay Dogra as Sub Inspector Satpal
 Neeraj Khetrapal as SK Chowdhary
 Rohit Khurana as Prannoy Das
 Rohit Singh as Manni
 D Jackson as Damru

Episodes

Reception

Viewership 
Class debuted at Number 1 on Netflix India’s ‘Top 10 TV Shows in India Today’ list. It also debuted at Number 1 in Bangladesh while also debuting Top 10 in the ‘Top 10 TV Shows’ lists of Bahrain, Maldives, Mauritius, Oman, Pakistan, Qatar, UAE & Sri Lanka.

Critical response 
Rohan Naahar for Indian Express rated 4 out of 5 stars and wrote "It is unclear if we’re meant to accept this version of the Capital as the truth. For instance, Faruq, who lives like a vagabond, goes on a date to Cafe Dori in one scene. Ridiculous as it often is, Class plays its drama dead straight. And this might be an issue. A little self-awareness goes a long way.

Tamma Moksha for The Hindu wrote "Featuring a host of debutants, the show is set in Hampton International, a private school in Delhi that boasts of giant swimming pools, coveted MUN conferences, and prestigious scholarships to study abroad — an archetype of the perfect dream school… until a student is found murdered outside the school premises and her acquaintances become prime suspects."

Tushar Joshi for India Today rated 3.5 stars out of 5 stars and wrote "If you have watched Elite then you will end up drawing multiple parallels with Class. But if you let these comparisons stay far away from your experience, you are in for a reward. Class is some top-notch writing and also some brilliant casting. These boys and girls who represent two opposite diasporas of high school life look their part."

Archika Khurana of The Times of India wrote "Inspired by the Spanish version, the series producer and director, Ashim Ahluwalia, incorporates a posh school into the picture, where most of the scenes were shot. The production values are high and clearly on par with the Spanish school to depict the lifestyle of these hi-fi students."

Udita Jhunjhunwala for Scroll.in wrote "Series director Ashim Ahluwalia creates an immersive world of haves and have-nots, of entrenched prejudices embedded in Indian culture – whether about community, class, caste or sexuality. The color palette – glossy and cool for the wealthy homes, saturated and grittier for the less well-to-do spaces, along with the music, production design, and cinematography work with the easy-breezy dialogue opposite to Gen-Z."

Sanchita Jhunjhunwala of Zoom TV wrote "To be able to understand the dynamics and what goes through by just reading is something that won't be possible as there are quite a few complex plots and subplots all going at the same time, but they are all meaningful. With so many characters, it was rather easy to have lost the plot or either rush it up, but that does not happen with this show, for everything flows naturally, even the Indianisation of the entire storyline."

Rahul Shinde for The Envoy Web wrote "The friendships depicted in the show don’t seem real at all. For instance, it’s suggested that Suhani and Koel are childhood friends, but the show doesn’t care to bring them together in one frame until the plot requires it."

Upasana Dandona for Women's Web wrote "If you have eight hours to spare on a series about South Delhi elitism, then Netflix series Class is definitely for you. Though, be warned that the makers know very little about South Delhi elites and the culture within South Delhi schools. A personal suggestion would be to fast forward all scenes and only watch the ones featuring Faruq and Dhruv—the two make an adorable queer couple.""

References

External links 

2020s crime drama television series
2020s high school television series
2020s LGBT-related drama television series
2020s teen drama television series
2023 web series debuts
2023 Indian television series debuts
Crime thriller television series
Gay-related television shows
Hindi-language Netflix original programming
Indian crime television series
Indian teen drama television series
Indian LGBT-related television shows
Indian web series
Male bisexuality in fiction
Mass media portrayals of the upper class
Murder in television
Nonlinear narrative television series
Teenage pregnancy in television
Television series about teenagers
Television shows filmed in India
Television series about bullying
Non-Spanish television series based on Spanish television series